Patrick John Morris (13 April 1948 – 16 January 2008) was a British composer, musician, and songwriter.

He was educated at Highgate School, Guildhall School of Music, the Royal Academy of Music, and University College London, where he obtained a degree in philosophy.

Disillusioned with contemporary classical music in the style of Stockhausen and Boulez, he developed a style that one critic, Jonathan Witshire, has called "residual", a label he accepted. He described his main musical influences as Erik Satie and Brian Eno, whom he rated as the most important composers of the twentieth century. His style is associated with that of his contemporary Howard Skempton and has been compared to younger composer Simon Rackham, who released a piece for two pianos called 'Warhorse' dedicated to the memory of Patrick Morris on his 2011 album, Once In a Blue Moonlight.

He placed his works into three groups, piano music, instrumental pieces and songs. For the songs he set poems to music and sang them, verses by A. E. Housman, W. E. Henley, Walter de la Mare and other well-known poets, and particularly the Australian-born poet Vicki Raymond. From about 1990, he wrote and sang his own songs, mysterious poems evoking an atmosphere of mortality, lonely, marginalised characters, and wistful melancholy.

He gave regular concerts in St Michael's Church, Highgate. His music has been played on BBC Radio 3, he has performed in Germany, the Czech Republic and Slovakia.

He produced a number of CDs, including They Call Him Mister P, The World of Mister P, The Essential Mister P and Slow Bulldozing with Mister P.

He also wrote the soundtrack for a number of arthouse films, including the documentary, LuXus, about abstract painter Philip Diggle.

For the last few years of his life he returned to the house in Highgate, where he had spent his childhood and where he was found dead on 16 January 2008.

References

External links
Patrick Morris: The World of Mr P...
Steve Reich and Debussy: Some Connexions, by Patrick Morris  © 1987 Cambridge University Press.
A big rude man who everybody loved.

1948 births
2008 deaths
English composers
English songwriters
People from Highgate
People educated at Highgate School
Alumni of University College London
20th-century classical composers
20th-century British composers